Melissa Reddy (born 24 August 1986) is a South African football journalist and author. Reddy left her role as the Senior Football Correspondent at The Independent in March 2022, to become a senior reporter for Sky Sports and Sky Sports News. Her speciality is the Premier League.

Career
Whilst studying at university, Reddy did an internship at Summit TV, a business channel in South Africa. After moving to Cape Town and joining TEAMtalk Media in 2007 and working across many sports, Reddy was Head of Football by 2011, before becoming Deputy Editor of KICK OFF Magazine which is Africa's largest sport publication. On both occasions, she was the first female to hold such a post and was also the first to feature as a football analyst on SuperSport’s marquee shows Backpages and Monday Night Football.

Reddy became the Liverpool Correspondent of Goal's 38 editions worldwide in November 2015. Reddy was then football correspondent at ESPN, wrote for The Athletic, and became the senior football correspondent at JOE, before joining The Independent as Senior football correspondent in November 2019.

Reddy's television appearances include Sky Sports News 'Tackling Racism’, Sunday Supplement and Red Men TV and the BBC’s Premier League Show. Reddy has also guested on BBC Radio Five Live.

Reddy has written for, guested and presented shows on The Anfield Wrap. Reddy has also presented shows on The Football Ramble, and guested on Second Captains, and BT Sport’s Football Writers Podcast. In 2020 Reddy started her own podcast interview series entitled Between The Lines with Melissa Reddy. Guests have included Gary Lineker, Mauricio Pochettino and Daniel Sturridge.

In 2020 Reddy released her first book, entitled Believe Us: How Jürgen Klopp Transformed Liverpool Into Title Winners. The book was referenced by England national rugby union team head coach Eddie Jones as an insight into the thinking and practises of the elite team produced by Jürgen Klopp at Liverpool FC.

Reddy has spoken prominently about the racism and sexism she has endured forging her career and barriers women face.

Reddy was shortlisted in the Best Writer category in the 2021 Football Supporters' Association awards.

References

1986 births
Living people
Women sports journalists
Sports journalists